Chhapamar ko Chhoro is a Nepali short story collection by Mahesh Bikram Shah. The book was published in 2007 by Sajha Prakashan. The book won the prestigious Madan Puraskar for the year 2063 BS (2007-2008). The anthology consists of eighteen stories centered around Maoist insurgency in Nepal.

Background 
Shah is a police officer. The stories are based on the difficulties of ordinary people during the Maoist insurgency in Nepal.

Stories 
Some of the stories included in the anthology are:
Badhsala ma Buddha [Buddha in a Slaughter House]
Ma ra Murdaharu [Me and Corpses]
Ekadeshma [In a Country]
Babuko Kandh ma Chhoro Sutiraheko Desh [The Country where the Son is Sleeping in the Father’s Shoulder]
Mero Kukur Aajhai Bhukiraheko Thiyo [My Dog was Still Barking]
Bandha Dhoka ra Samaya [Closed Door and Time]
Bandha Dhoka ra Sapanaharu [Broken Door and the Dreams]

Awards 
The book was awarded with Madan Puraskar for the year 2063 BS (2007-2008).

See also 

 Kumari Prashnaharu
 Nepali Lok Katha
 Baikuntha Express
 Seto Dharti

References

Madan Puraskar-winning works
Nepalese books
Nepalese short story collections
21st-century Nepalese books
Nepali short story collections
Nepali-language books
2007 short story collections
Works about the Nepalese Civil War